The Oxford Student is a newspaper produced by and for students of the University of Oxford; often abbreviated to The OxStu. The paper was established in 1991 by the Oxford University Student Union (Oxford SU) and is published every fortnightly Friday during term time. Articles are also published daily on the paper's website and social media pages regardless of term dates. The paper is the university's most widely circulated student paper, with over 15,000 copies distributed across Oxford each term.

Structure 
The Oxford Student is owned by the Oxford SU and run through the Student Union's commercial subsidiary, Oxford Student Services Ltd (OSSL). The newspaper's constitution grants the paper editorial independence. It enjoys close relations with Oxide Radio, also owned by Oxford SU.

Two Editors-In-Chief are appointed each term by the Oxford SU Media Board, a panel of former Editors-In-Chief, student sabbatical officers, and SU staff. The Editors-In-Chief are current students of the university who have complete editorial autonomy over the paper. After their appointment in the finals weeks of term, they are responsible for releasing editorial team applications for the upcoming term, inviting applicants to interview. Applications are competitive, and a team of anywhere from 30-80 students are accepted to edit and work on the publication each term.

Current sections of the newspaper include: News, Comment, Investigations, Features, Pink, Identity, Green, Profile, Science & Technology, Culture (consisting of Life and Entertainment sub-sections), Food & Drink, OxYou, E-Sports and Sports.  In addition, there is a Broadcasting Team which produces video content for the paper's website and social media platforms.

In response to the Covid-19 pandemic and the resulting lack of sports fixtures within the university, the Sports section was temporarily changed to E-sports and Gaming in Trinity 2020 but will remain alongside Sport for Michaelmas 2020 due to its popularity.

In Hilary 2021, a new Green section was added to cover environmental and sustainability issues.

Inclusivity

In Michaelmas 2016, the newspaper introduced Pink (aimed towards LGBTQIA+ members of the university) as a sub-section of Features; due to its popularity, in Hilary 2017, Pink was launched as its own section. Edited and written by non-heterosexual or non-cisgender students, the newspaper regularly anonymises the Pink articles in order to protect the identities of writers who do not feel comfortable publicly authoring articles relating to LGBTQIA+ issues.

In January 2020, a new section was created called Identity, described as being "dedicated to spotlighting the issues, opinions and experiences of BAME students within the University". Structured similarly to Pink, the editors of Identity - as well as those who submit writing to be published in the section - are BAME students at the university.

Accolades

The Oxford Student was named "Student Newspaper of the Year" at the Guardian Student Media Awards in 2001, was shortlisted in 2004 and 2012, and awarded the runner-up prize in 2007.

Controversies

In 2004, the newspaper gained national publicity when two reporters broke University rules to expose security flaws in the University's computer network; the student journalists responsible, Patrick Foster and Roger Waite, were rusticated by the University Court of Summary Jurisdiction, but on appeal their punishment was reduced to a fine. Foster now works as Media Correspondent for The Times, and Waite worked for the Sunday Times for a few years after graduating.

In June 2021, the newspaper was the subject of controversy over perceived threats to their independence, after a vetting system was proposed which would have required student articles to be reviewed by a University-affiliated readers.

Notable Contributors

Former contributors include Laura Barton and Jonathan Wilson of The Guardian, Mark Henderson and Rob Hands of The Times, and Karl Smith of The Independent.

Former Editors 

 Anisha Faruk & Arya Tandon (TT18)
 Charlie Willis & James Ashworth (MT18)
 Tom Gould & Jonathan Sands (HT19)
 Jay Staker & Nat Rachman (TT19)
 Grace Davis & Maria Kostylew (MT19)
 Alex Haveron-Jones & Bethan Roberts (HT20)
 Matthew Kayanja & Emily Charley (TT20)
 Josh Boddington & Lauren Shirreff (MT20) 
 Robert Macllraith & Isabel Fleming (HT21) 
 Isaac Healey & Natasha Alexis Tan (TT21) 
 Madeleine Ross & Poppy Atkinson Gibson (MT21) 
 Alex Foster & Andrew Wang (HT22) 
 Dania Kamal Aryf and Elias Formaggia (TT22)
 Dominic Enright and Jason Chau (MT22)

References

External links
The Oxford Student

Publications established in 1992
Student newspapers published in the United Kingdom
Publications associated with the University of Oxford
1992 establishments in England